Ghoti (Pôshchim bôngiyô) are a social group native to the state of West Bengal, in India.

Etymology
Among the Bengalis of India, the term "Ghoti" is given to those people who are native to the western part of the ancient Bengal region while the term "Bangal" are used for the social sub-groups indicating the ancestral origin of a family from Bangladesh or Purbo Bango which was historically the eastern part of Bengal region. 

The term "Ghoti" has been known to be used since at least the early-18th century. While all Ghotis are ethno-linguistically Bengali, the term does not refer to a single community of people, and was initially not bound by religion. Instead, it is geographic in nature, loosely referring to all Bengali-speaking inhabitants of the western parts of the historic region of Bengal. 

In history and popular culture, Western Bengal includes the land west of the Padma river (the tributary of the Ganges that flows eastwards), such as Jessore District and Khulna District in Bangladesh and almost the entirety of the state of West Bengal in India. Jessore and Khulna were Hindu-majority districts that were included in Pakistan during the partition of Bengal, while Muslim-majority Murshidabad was included in India to resolve border contiguity issues.

History

The usage of the term shot up since 1947 when India got its independence and the region of Bengal was bifurcated. The western half of Bengal, historic homeland of the Ghoti people, became the state of West Bengal, while the eastern half (Pūrbô Bôngô) became East Pakistan. In 1971, East Pakistan became the nation of Bangladesh after the Liberation of Bangladesh.

During both events, as well as before and after them, millions of Hindu Bangals fled from East Pakistan and Bangladesh due to religious persecution and political repression by the majority Muslim populace. These Bangal refugees competed for housing, food and employment as population density in West Bengal soared.

The term "Ghoti" was popularised by these refugees to identify the native population as well as the associated native culture, facets of which was significantly different from that in eastern Bengal. Subsequently, the native population, which was economically better placed and controlled the majority of the land and job resources, internalized the term. This arose from their desire and need to socially distinguish themselves from the newcomers, who were discriminated upon.

Another result of these massive religious migrations of the 20th century, necessitated by religious persecution on both sides of the border, have been the complete erasing of the "Muslim Ghoti". Some Bengali Muslims living in the Western parts of the region, left India for Bangladesh. After Bangladesh's independence, its founders espoused the national cultural identity of the country to be singularly bengali, without regional cultural allegiances. So, few Bangladeshi Muslims identify with their cultural Ghoti roots while those in West Bengal identify as either simply Muslims and/or Bengalis, culturally.

1980s onwards
The terms "Ghoti" or "Bangal" now has little relation to actual geography, since most members of both groups live in India, mostly in West Bengal. The term is used freely and not considered derogatory within this social class now. The intrinsic differences between Ghotis and Bangals, and their rivalries are now part of the larger Culture of West Bengal. Millions of Bengalis in modern-day India, now have both Ghoti and Bangal heritage, with a high rate of intermarriage between the communities over the preceding four decades.

Culture
The dialects, folk traditions (Lokachaar) and cuisine of Ghotis are distinct from those of the Purbabangiyas or the natives of erstwhile eastern Bengal.

Initially, there was a protracted period of cultural and sociological clash between the native population and the refugees. Ghotis are frequently distinguished by their Bangla accent and use of certain local dialects and figures of speech that Bangals, in general, would not use.

Religious practices
The religious practices of Ghoti families differ significantly from other hindu families in the rest of the state.Ghotis perform Lakshmi puja (mostly only at home) on the day of Kali Puja, like the rest of North India and Bihar. On the other hand, bangals celebrate Lakshmi puja on the fifth day after Durga Puja, like the people of Assam and Tripura.

Cuisine
Sweets are a major part of Ghoti cuisine, as is the case for the entire Bengal region. Sweets such as Rosogolla, Mishti doi, Ledikeni, Langcha, Jaynagar'er Moa, Roshomalai, Pantua, Jol Bhora Talsash, Mihidana, Roshokadamba, Rajbhog and Gopalbhog, among others, are known to originate in Western Bengal and are a staple of Ghoti culture.

In terms of seafood, an important element of Bengali cuisine, Ghoti people are generally more associated with (Prawns), locally called 'Chingri', used to make a broad variety of Chingri malai curry. As compared to this, Bangals share a love for Hilsa fish, (popularly known as 'Ilish' in West Bengal).

Ghotis are also known for including a wide number of dishes with 'Posto' (Poppy seed) in their cuisine.

Sports

Mohun Bagan vs East Bengal : Traditionally, West Bengal has been a major centre for football and a longstanding rivalry between Ghoti and Bangal people on the football field have been a hallmark of the larger social friction between the groups.

Ghoti people have historically supported the Mohun Bagan AC whereas the Bangals  are traditionally supporters of East Bengal Club  which has been created after partition of Bengal year 1971. Though there are several exceptions, both communities in general have supported their respective teams since the 1950s. A popular culture mainstay in Kolkata, this deep rivalry has often resulted in violent clashes during matches, in the presence of thousands of fans.

In a typical season, the clubs currently meet at least 3 times a year; twice in the I-League and once in the Calcutta Football League. The ultimate showdown between the teams takes place during the annual Kolkata Derby, which features in FIFA's classic derby list.

The primary venue of the match - the 85,000-seat Salt Lake Stadium - has remained soldout on match day, for decades. The Kolkata Police Force has in recent years maintained strict supervision after riots between fans claimed lives on multiple occasions. Often the clubs also meet in other competitions like the Federation Cup (India), the IFA Shield, and the Durand Cup, among others.

See also

Rarhi dialect
Partition of India
Partition of Bengal (1947)

Reference 

Social groups of West Bengal